Mad Families is a 2017 American comedy film directed by Fred Wolf, and starring Charlie Sheen, Leah Remini and Charlotte McKinney. The film is an original production by Crackle.

Plot 

A fun Fourth of July outing quickly turns sour when a family discovers that its space at a campsite has also been assigned to two other families. The three families end up competing for the camping spot.

Cast

References

External links 

2017 films
2017 comedy films
American comedy films
Films directed by Fred Wolf
Films scored by J. Peter Robinson
Independence Day (United States) films
Films with screenplays by David Spade
Films with screenplays by Fred Wolf
2010s English-language films
2010s American films